Sinea spinipes is a species of assassin bug, family (Reduviidae), in the subfamily Harpactorinae. It is native to North America and found in the midwest along roadsides, forest edges, and open fields with scattered trees.

In southern Illinois S. spinipes is univoltine (has only one brood per year).

References

Reduviidae
Hemiptera of North America
Insects described in 1846